Swanscombe and Greenhithe is a civil parish in the Borough of Dartford in Kent, England. Swanscombe and Greenhithe is a recent renaming of the ancient parish of Swanscombe, covering Swanscombe and Greenhithe. It includes much of the Ebbsfleet Valley new town development.

History
Swanscombe was an ancient parish in the Axstane Hundred of Kent. In 1894 it became part of Dartford Rural District and Swanscombe Parish Council was formed. In 1926 it was removed from the rural district and became a separate urban district When the urban district was abolished in 1974 the parish council was formed again as the successor parish to Swanscombe Urban District. In 1981 Swanscombe Parish Council resolved to become a town council and was renamed Swanscombe and Greenhithe, thus electing its own mayor for the first time.

Geography
The two villages which give the parish its name are both located on the south bank of the River Thames, approximately midway between Dartford town and Gravesend. At the 2011 Census the population of the civil parish was 14,128. Swanscombe village is an ancient one. The parish includes much of the Ebbsfleet Valley area which is undergoing regeneration from industry (cement works at one time dominated it) to housing and lighter industrial use. Greenhithe railway station also serves the Bluewater shopping centre.

References

External links
Visit Swanscombe, Swanscombe & Greenhithe Town Guide
Swanscombe And Greenhithe Town Council
Neighbourhood Renewal Officer

Borough of Dartford
Civil parishes in Kent
Greenhithe